Sir John Curtois Howard KC (15 January 1887 – 19 November 1970) was an English magistrate who was the 27th Chief Justice of Ceylon. He was appointed in 1939 succeeding the acting Francis Soertsz and was Chief Justice until 1945. He was succeeded by Arthur Wijewardena, also after the acting Francis Soertsz.

Howard was born in Spalding, Lincolnshire, to FitzAlan Howard and Edith Thacker. He was educated at Uppingham School and Clare College, Cambridge. He was called to the bar a year before the First World War, and his career was interrupted by six years in the British Army.

After the war, he accepted a job in the Colonial Legal Service, serving as Attorney General of Cyprus, Solicitor-General of Nigeria and Attorney-General of the Gold Coast (now Ghana). In 1936, he was promoted to Legal Secretary, Ceylon. After returning to England, from 1953 to 1957, he was chairman of the Police Council for Great Britain. He was recalled by Sir William Fitzgerald as "a strikingly handsome man with a commanding presence."

Howard was knighted in the 1942 New Year Honours.

References

1887 births
1970 deaths
Chief Justices of British Ceylon
20th-century Sri Lankan people
British expatriates in Sri Lanka
19th-century Sri Lankan people
Sri Lankan people of British descent
Attorneys General of British Ceylon
Attorneys-General of British Cyprus
Knights Bachelor
Alumni of Clare College, Cambridge
20th-century English judges
Colonial Legal Service officers
Legal Secretary of Ceylon